Maurizio Marchetto (born February 13, 1956) is a former ice speed skater from Italy, who represented his  native country in three consecutive Winter Olympics, starting in 1976 in Innsbruck, Austria.

After his active career Marchetto has been coach for the Italian speed skating team, having success with skaters like Roberto Sighel (world champion 1994) and Enrico Fabris (olympic champion 2006). From 2009/2010, he is also coach for Russian speed skater Ivan Skobrev and for French speed skater Alexis Contin.

References
 SkateResults

External links
 

1956 births
Living people
Italian male speed skaters
Speed skaters at the 1976 Winter Olympics
Speed skaters at the 1980 Winter Olympics
Speed skaters at the 1984 Winter Olympics
Olympic speed skaters of Italy
Place of birth missing (living people)